"Biko" is an anti-apartheid protest song by English rock musician Peter Gabriel. It was released by Charisma Records as a single from Gabriel's eponymous third album in 1980.

The song is a musical eulogy, inspired by the death of the black South African anti-apartheid activist Steve Biko in police custody on 12 September 1977. Gabriel wrote the song after hearing of Biko's death on the news. Influenced by Gabriel's growing interest in African musical styles, the song carried a sparse two-tone beat played on Brazilian drum and vocal percussion, in addition to a distorted guitar, and a synthesised bagpipe sound. The lyrics, which included phrases in Xhosa, describe Biko's death and the violence under the apartheid government. The song is book-ended with recordings of songs sung at Biko's funeral: the album version begins with "Ngomhla sibuyayo" and ends with "Senzeni Na?", while the single versions end with "Nkosi Sikelel' iAfrika".

"Biko" reached No. 38 on the British charts, and was positively received, with critics praising the instrumentation, the lyrics, and Gabriel's vocals. A 2013 commentary called it a "hauntingly powerful" song, while review website AllMusic described it as a "stunning achievement for its time". It was banned in South Africa, where the government saw it as a threat to security. "Biko" was a personal landmark for Gabriel, becoming one of his most popular songs and sparking his involvement in human rights activism. It also had a huge political impact, and along with other contemporary music critical of apartheid, is credited with making resistance to apartheid part of western popular culture. It inspired musical projects such as Sun City, and has been called "arguably the most significant non-South African anti-apartheid protest song".

Background
Bantu Stephen Biko was an anti-apartheid activist who was a founding member of the South African Students' Organisation in 1968 and the Black People's Convention in 1972. Through these groups, and through other activities, he promoted the ideas of the Black Consciousness movement, and became a prominent member of the resistance to apartheid in the 1970s. The government of South Africa placed a banning order on him in 1973, preventing him from leaving his hometown, meeting with more than one person, publishing his writing, and speaking in public. In August 1977 Biko was arrested for breaking his banning order.

After his arrest Biko was held in custody in Port Elizabeth, Eastern Cape for several days, during which he was interrogated. During his interrogation he was severely beaten by some of the policemen questioning him. He suffered severe injuries, including to his brain, and died soon after on 12 September 1977. News of his death spread quickly, and became a symbol of the abuses perpetrated under the apartheid government. Biko's position as an individual who had never been convicted of a crime led to the death being reported in the international press; he thus became one of first anti-apartheid activists widely known internationally.

Several musicians wrote songs about Biko, including Tom Paxton, Peter Hammill, Steel Pulse, and Tappa Zukie. British musician Peter Gabriel, who heard of Biko's death through the BBC's coverage of the event, was moved by the story and began researching his life, based on which he wrote a song about the killing. This coincided with Gabriel becoming interested in African musical styles, which influenced his third solo album Peter Gabriel (1980), also known as Melt, on which "Biko"  was ultimately included. Gabriel was also influenced to write the song through his association with politically inclined new-wave musician Tom Robinson; Robinson is said to have encouraged Gabriel to release the piece when Gabriel began to have doubts. Though there were other political songs on the album, "Biko" was the only piece that was explicitly a protest song.

Music and lyrics

The lyrics of the song begin in a manner similar to a news story, saying "September '77/Port Elizabeth, weather fine". The next lines mention "police room 619", the room in the police station of Port Elizabeth in which Biko was beaten. The English lyrics are broken up by the Xhosa phrase "Yila Moja" (also transliterated "Yehla Moya") meaning "Come Spirit": the phrase has been read as a call to Biko's spirit to join the resistance movement, and as a suggestion that though Biko was dead, his spirit was still alive.

The tone of the songs shifts after the first verse, growing more defiant, and the second verse of the song criticises the violence under apartheid, with Gabriel singing about trying to sleep but being able to "only dream in red" because of his anger at the death of black people. The lyrics of the third verse seek to motivate the listener: "You can blow out a candle/But you can't blow out a fire/Once the flames begin to catch/The wind will blow it higher", suggesting that though Biko is dead, the movement against apartheid would continue. The lyrics express a sense of outrage, not only at the suffering of people under apartheid, but at the fact that that suffering was often forgotten or denied.

Gabriel incorporated three songs by other composers into his recording. The album version of the songs start with an excerpt from the South African song "Ngomhla sibuyayo" and ends with a recording of the South African song "Senzeni Na?", as sung at Biko's funeral. The 7- and 12-inch single versions ended instead with an excerpt from "Nkosi Sikelel iAfrika", a song which would later become South Africa's National Anthem. The German version of the song began and ended with "Nkosi Sikelel iAfrika". The recording ends with a double drum beat reminiscent of gun shots that cuts off the singers at the funeral, seen as representing a repressive government.

The recording at the beginning of the song fades into a two-toned percussion, played on a Brazilian Surdo drum, described by Gabriel as the "spine of the piece". "Biko" makes use of a "hypnotic" drum beat throughout the song, influenced strongly by African rhythms Gabriel had heard. In particular, Gabriel would credit the soundtrack LP Dingaka with influencing the percussion of the track. Music scholar Michael Drewett writes that Gabriel tried to create an "exotic" African beat "without really approximating the sound he imitated", thus creating a "pseudo-African" beat. The tune is punctuated with vocal percussive sounds that have a "primordial" feeling, combining Gaelic and African influences. The drums are overlaid with an artificially distorted two-chord guitar sound, which fades out briefly during the vocal percussion, before returning during the first verse.

The first verse describing Biko's death is followed by a distinct chord change before the Xhosa invocation "Yehla Moya". The sound of bagpipes, created with a synthesiser, enters the song during the interlude between the verses. Played in a "mournful" minor key, they have been variously described as creating a "funeral" and a "militaristic" atmosphere. The bagpipes continue alongside the drums and guitar through the second verse, followed by an interlude identical to the first. A snare drum is also added to the sound for the second and third verses. The third verse concludes with a non-verbal chant following the chord progression of the song, while the climax is a chorus of male voices, accompanied by bagpipes and drums.

Recording and releases
Gabriel provided lead vocals and piano. The guitarist for "Biko" was David Rhodes, Gabriel's longtime collaborator. Other participants included Jerry Marotta on drums, Phil Collins on surdo, Larry Fast on synths and synthesised bagpipes, and Dave Ferguson on screeches. However, a 2016 "listener's companion" to Gabriel's music named Phil Collins as the drummer on the song, Larry Fast as playing the synthesiser, and Jerry Marotta as playing the snare drum.

"Biko" was first released as a single in 1980. Gabriel donated the proceeds from both versions of the single to the Black Consciousness Movement in South Africa. These donations would total more than 50,000 pounds. The B-side of the 7" version contained Gabriel's version of the Ndebele folks song "Shosholoza", while the 12" version also carried a German vocal version of Gabriel's 1979 track "Here Comes the Flood".

"Biko" was included on Gabriel's third solo album Peter Gabriel III (1980) (a.k.a. Melt) released by Charisma Records in 1980. At seven and one-half minutes, it was the album's longest song. The track was later included on his 1990 compilation Shaking the Tree: Sixteen Golden Greats.

Reception
Upon its release "Biko" reached No. 38 on the British charts. The 1987 live version reached No. 49 in the UK. In 2016 Gabriel's biographer Durrell Bowman ranked "Biko" as among Gabriel's 11 most popular songs. Peter Gabriel III topped the British charts for two weeks, giving Gabriel his first No. 1 hit.

Soon after its release, a copy of "Biko" was seized by South African customs and submitted to the Directorate of Publications, which banned the song and the album on which it featured for being critical of apartheid, calling it "harmful to the security of the State". Thus, despite enduring popularity outside South Africa, it had no presence within the country. 
 
The song received strongly positive responses from critics, and it was frequently cited as the highlight of the album. Phil Sutcliffe in Sounds magazine said the song was "so honest you might even risk calling it truth". Music website AllMusic called "Biko" a "stunning achievement for its time", and went on to say that "It's odd that such a bleak song can sound so freeing and liberating". Writing in 2013, Mark Pedelty would say that "Biko" "stood out for its unusual instrumentation (bagpipes and synthesiser), haunting vocals, and funerary chant," and credited Gabriel with doing a "masterful job of creating catalytic imagery and getting out of the way". Music scholar Michael Drewett wrote that the lyrics skillfully engaged the listener by moving from a specific story to a call for action.

The musical elements of the song also received praise. Drewett stated that Gabriel's singing throughout the song was "clear and powerful". Though Drewett questioned the use of bagpipes, he stated that they heightened the emotional effect of the song. 2013, scholar Ingrid Byerly called "Biko" a "hauntingly powerful" song, with "a hypnotic drumbeat thundering beneath commanding guitar, lyrical bagpipe dirges, and the intense eulogy of Gabriel's voice". A review in Rolling Stone was more critical of the song, saying that the melody and rhythms of the piece were "irresistible", but that the song was a "muddle", and that "what Gabriel [had] to say was mostly sentimental."

Gabriel's use of Xhosa lyrics have been read by scholars as evidence of the "authenticity" of Gabriel's effort to highlight Biko. By using a language that many South Africans, and the majority of outsiders, did not know, the words trigger curiosity; in the words of Byerly, "compelling [listeners]...to become, like Gabriel, insiders to the struggle". In contrast, scholar Derek Hook has written that the song highlighted the artist, rather than Biko himself, and "[secured] for the singer and his audience a kind of anti-racist social capital". Hook questioned whether the "consciousness raising" efforts of the song could turn into "anti-racist narcissism". Drewett stated that the use of a simplistic and generic "African" beat was an indication of an "imperial imagination" in the song's composition.

Impact and legacy
"Biko" had an enormous political impact. It has been credited with creating a "political awakening" both in terms of awareness of the brutalities of apartheid, and of Steve Biko as a person. It greatly raised Biko's profile, making his name known to millions of people who had not previously heard of him, and came to symbolise Biko in the popular imagination. Byerly writes that it was an example of the "right song written at the right time by the right person"; it was released in circumstances of social tension that contributed to its popularity and influence. It triggered a rise in enthusiasm for fighting against apartheid internationally, and has been described as "arguably the most significant non-South African anti-apartheid protest song".

"Biko" was at the forefront of a stream of anti-apartheid music in the 1980s, and sparked a worldwide interest in music exploring the politics and society of South Africa. Along with songs such as "Free Nelson Mandela" by The Specials, and "Sun City" by Artists United Against Apartheid, "Biko" has been described as part of the "soundtrack for the global divestment movement", which sought to persuade divestment from companies doing business in apartheid South Africa. These songs have been described as making the fight against apartheid part of Western popular culture. Gabriel's piece has been credited as the inspiration for many of the anti-apartheid songs that followed it. Steven Van Zandt, the driving force behind the 1985 track "Sun City" and the Artists United Against Apartheid initiative, stated that hearing "Biko" inspired him to begin those projects; on the cover of the album, he thanked Gabriel "for the profound inspiration of his song ‘Biko’ which is where my
journey to Africa began". Irish singer and U2 frontman Bono called Gabriel to tell him that U2 had learned of the effects of apartheid from "Biko".

The song was a landmark for Gabriel's career. "Biko" has been called Gabriel's first political song, his "most enduring political tune", and "Arguably [his] first masterpiece". It caught the attention of activist organisations, and in particular anti-apartheid groups and human rights organisations such as Amnesty International (AI). "Biko" became popular among AI workers, along with Gabriel's 1982 song "Wallflower". The song triggered Gabriel's involvement in musical efforts against apartheid: he supported the "Sun City" project, and participated in two musical tours organised by AI: A Conspiracy of Hope in 1986, and Human Rights Now! in 1988. It also led to him beginning a deeper involvement in those groups.

Other versions
Gabriel sang the piece at Nelson Mandela 70th Birthday Tribute concert at Wembley Stadium in 1988. The concert featured a number of well-known artists, including Dire Straits, Miriam Makeba, Simple Minds, Eurythmics, and Tracy Chapman. During his live performances of "Biko", Gabriel frequently concluded asking the audience to engage in political action, saying "I've done what I can, the rest is up to you." It was often the last song of a performance, with the band members gradually leaving the stage during the song's concluding drum coda.

A live version, recorded in July 1987 at the Blossom Music Center in Cuyahoga Falls, Ohio, was released as a single later that year, to promote Richard Attenborough's Biko biopic Cry Freedom. The music video consists of clips from the film and Gabriel singing. The song did not appear in the actual film.

"Biko" was covered by a number of well known artists. Robert Wyatt's 1984 version from his Work in Progress EP made #35 in that year's John Peel Festive Fifty. "Biko" was featured prominently in "Evan", the penultimate episode of the first season of the American television show Miami Vice in 1985. Folk musicians and activist Joan Baez recorded a version on her 1987 album Recently. Simple Minds released a cover version on their 1989 album Street Fighting Years, a version later featured on other collections of their music. It was covered by Cameroonian musician Manu Dibango on his 1994 album Wakafrika. Dibango's version also featured Gabriel, Sinead O'Connor, Ladysmith Black Mambazo, Geoffrey Oryema, and Alex Brown. Folk-rock musician Paul Simon recorded a cover of the song for inclusion on the 2013 Gabriel tribute album And I'll Scratch Yours.

In 2021, a version of Biko was recorded and released through Playing for Change in honor of Black History Month, 40 years after the song's initial release. More than 25 musicians from seven countries joined Gabriel on the recording, including Beninese vocalist and activist Angélique Kidjo, cellist Yo-Yo Ma and bassist Meshell Ndegeocello.

See also

Peter Gabriel discography
Cry Freedom, 1987 film about Biko's death

Notes and references
Notes

References

Sources

 
 
 
 
 
 
 
 
 
 
 

Peter Gabriel songs
Robert Wyatt songs
1980 singles
1987 singles
Songs against racism and xenophobia
Music videos directed by Godley and Creme
Songs written by Peter Gabriel
Song recordings produced by Steve Lillywhite
1980 songs
Charisma Records singles
Geffen Records singles
Songs about prison
Songs about politicians
Songs about activists
Songs about South Africa
Cultural depictions of South African men
Steve Biko affair
Anti-apartheid songs